Marcelo Logan Ponti Jr. (born January 31, 1971), known professionally as Marc Logan or Kaka Marc, is a Filipino broadcast journalist, TV host, comedian, and radio commentator who specializes in satirical and comical infotainment. He is popularly known for his tongue-in-cheek reporting and comedic voice overs. He is also active in social media and tabloids providing infotainment.

Career 
In 1996, Logan was hired to read humorous trivial segments and features on TV Patrol, the flagship national network news broadcast of the ABS-CBN station. Logan introduced the concept of "infotainment", information combined with entertainment news. He hosted and produced the program Mga Kwento ni Marc Logan, a weekly entertainment show which features humorous videos collected from social media posts. Logan previously hosted a show with the same concept titled Vid-Joking. His segment on TV Patrol is also named "Mga Kwento ni Marc Logan" and previously was "Meron Akong Kwento".

Filmography

Television
Mga Kwento ni Marc Logan (ABS-CBN 2)
Showtime (ABS-CBN 2) - guest celebrity judge
TV Patrol (ABS-CBN 2)
Bandila (ABS-CBN 2)
Matanglawin (ABS-CBN 2) - guest co-host
Rated K (ABS-CBN 2)
Pinoy Big Brother (ABS-CBN 2)
Gandang Gabi Vice (ABS-CBN 2) - guest
Tonight with Boy Abunda (ABS-CBN 2)

Films
 Ayuda Babes as Marc Logan (Himself)

Radio
Logan Live (DZMM 630 kHz, 2011–2012)
Sakto (DZMM 630 kHz, 2014–2018)
Lima at Logan: Tandem! (DZMM 630 kHz, 2018–2020)

References

External links
 
 Marc Logan on NewsFlash
 Marc Logan reports on ABS-CBN news

Living people
Filipino radio journalists
Filipino television journalists
People from Metro Manila
Polytechnic University of the Philippines alumni
1971 births
Filipino male comedians
ABS-CBN personalities
ABS-CBN News and Current Affairs people